In algebraic geometry, given a morphism f: X → S of schemes, the cotangent sheaf on X is the sheaf of -modules  that represents (or classifies) S-derivations in the sense: for any -modules F, there is an isomorphism

In the case X and S are affine schemes, the above definition means that  is the module of Kähler differentials. The standard way to construct a cotangent sheaf (e.g., Hartshorne, Ch II. § 8) is through a diagonal morphism (which amounts to gluing modules of Kähler differentials on affine charts to get the globally-defined cotangent sheaf.)

There are two important exact sequences:
If S →T is a morphism of schemes, then

If Z is a closed subscheme of X with ideal sheaf I, then

The cotangent sheaf is closely related to smoothness of a variety or scheme. For example, an algebraic variety is smooth of dimension n if and only if ΩX is a locally free sheaf of rank n.

Construction through a diagonal morphism 

Let  be a morphism of schemes as in the introduction and Δ: X → X ×S X the diagonal morphism. Then the image of Δ is locally closed; i.e., closed in some open subset W of X ×S X (the image is closed if and only if f is separated). Let I be the ideal sheaf of Δ(X) in W. One then puts:

and checks this sheaf of modules satisfies the required universal property of a cotangent sheaf (Hartshorne, Ch II. Remark 8.9.2). The construction shows in particular that the cotangent sheaf is quasi-coherent. It is coherent if S is Noetherian and f is of finite type.

The above definition means that the cotangent sheaf on X is the restriction to X of the conormal sheaf to the diagonal embedding of X over S.

Relation to a tautological line bundle 

The cotangent sheaf on a projective space is related to the tautological line bundle O(-1) by the following exact sequence: writing  for the projective space over a ring R,

(See also Chern class#Complex projective space.)

Cotangent stack 
For this notion, see § 1 of
A. Beilinson and V. Drinfeld, Quantization of Hitchin’s integrable system and Hecke eigensheaves  
There, the cotangent stack on an algebraic stack X is defined as the relative Spec of the symmetric algebra of the tangent sheaf on X. (Note: in general, if E is a locally free sheaf of finite rank,  is the algebraic vector bundle corresponding to E.)

Notes

See also 
cotangent complex

References

External links 

Algebraic geometry